An estuary is a partially enclosed coastal body of brackish water with one or more rivers or streams flowing into it, and with a free connection to the open sea. Estuaries form a transition zone between river environments and maritime environments and are an example of an ecotone. Estuaries are subject both to marine influences such as tides, waves, and the influx of saline water, and to fluvial influences such as flows of freshwater and sediment. The mixing of seawater and freshwater provides high levels of nutrients both in the water column and in sediment, making estuaries among the most productive natural habitats in the world.

Most existing estuaries formed during the Holocene epoch with the flooding of river-eroded or glacially scoured valleys when the sea level began to rise about 10,000–12,000 years ago. Estuaries are typically classified according to their geomorphological features or to water-circulation patterns. They can have many different names, such as bays, harbors, lagoons, inlets, or sounds, although some of these water bodies do not strictly meet the above definition of an estuary and could be fully saline.

Many estuaries suffer degeneration from a variety of factors including soil erosion, deforestation, overgrazing, overfishing and the filling of wetlands. Eutrophication may lead to excessive nutrients from sewage and animal wastes; pollutants including heavy metals, polychlorinated biphenyls, radionuclides and hydrocarbons from sewage inputs; and diking or damming for flood control or water diversion.

Definition

 

The word "estuary" is derived from the Latin word aestuarium meaning tidal inlet of the sea, which in itself is derived from the term aestus, meaning tide. There have been many definitions proposed to describe an estuary. The most widely accepted definition is: "a semi-enclosed coastal body of water, which has a free connection with the open sea, and within which seawater is measurably diluted with freshwater derived from land drainage". However, this definition excludes a number of coastal water bodies such as coastal lagoons and brackish seas.

A more comprehensive definition of an estuary is "a semi-enclosed body of water connected to the sea as far as the tidal limit or the salt intrusion limit and receiving freshwater runoff; however the freshwater inflow may not be perennial, the connection to the sea may be closed for part of the year and tidal influence may be negligible". This broad definition also includes fjords, lagoons, river mouths, and tidal creeks. An estuary is a dynamic ecosystem having a connection to the open sea through which the sea water enters with the rhythm of the tides. The effects of tides on estuaries can show nonlinear effects on the movement of water which can have important impacts on the ecosystem and waterflow. The seawater entering the estuary is diluted by the fresh water flowing from rivers and streams. The pattern of dilution varies between different estuaries and depends on the volume of freshwater, the tidal range, and the extent of evaporation of the water in the estuary.

Classification based on geomorphology

Drowned river valleys

Drowned river valleys are also known as coastal plain estuaries. In places where the sea level is rising relative to the land, sea water progressively penetrates into river valleys and the topography of the estuary remains similar to that of a river valley. This is the most common type of estuary in temperate climates. Well-studied estuaries include the Severn Estuary in the United Kingdom and the Ems Dollard along the Dutch-German border.

The width-to-depth ratio of these estuaries is typically large, appearing wedge-shaped (in cross-section) in the inner part and broadening and deepening seaward.  Water depths rarely exceed . Examples of this type of estuary in the U.S. are the Hudson River, Chesapeake Bay, and Delaware Bay along the Mid-Atlantic coast, and Galveston Bay and Tampa Bay along the Gulf Coast.

Lagoon-type or bar-built

Bar-built estuaries are found in a place where the deposition of sediment has kept pace with rising sea levels so that the estuaries are shallow and separated from the sea by sand spits or barrier islands. They are relatively common in tropical and subtropical locations.

These estuaries are semi-isolated from ocean waters by barrier beaches (barrier islands and barrier spits). Formation of barrier beaches partially encloses the estuary, with only narrow inlets allowing contact with the ocean waters. Bar-built estuaries typically develop on gently sloping plains located along tectonically stable edges of continents and marginal sea coasts. The barrier beaches that enclose bar-built estuaries have been developed in several ways:
 building up of offshore bars by wave action, in which sand from the seafloor is deposited in elongated bars parallel to the shoreline,
 reworking of sediment discharge from rivers by a wave, current, and wind action into beaches, overwash flats, and dunes,
 engulfment of mainland beach ridges (ridges developed from the erosion of coastal plain sediments around 5000 years ago) due to sea level rise and resulting in the breaching of the ridges and flooding of the coastal lowlands, forming shallow lagoons, and
 elongation of barrier spits from the erosion of headlands due to the action of longshore currents, with the spits growing in the direction of the littoral drift.

Fjord-type
Fjords were formed where Pleistocene glaciers deepened and widened existing river valleys so that they become U-shaped in cross-sections. At their mouths there are typically rocks, bars or sills of glacial deposits, which have the effects of modifying the estuarine circulation.

Fjord-type estuaries are formed in deeply eroded valleys formed by glaciers. These U-shaped estuaries typically have steep sides, rock bottoms, and underwater sills contoured by glacial movement. The estuary is shallowest at its mouth, where terminal glacial moraines or rock bars form sills that restrict water flow. In the upper reaches of the estuary, the depth can exceed . The width-to-depth ratio is generally small. In estuaries with very shallow sills, tidal oscillations only affect the water down to the depth of the sill, and the waters deeper than that may remain stagnant for a very long time, so there is only an occasional exchange of the deep water of the estuary with the ocean. If the sill depth is deep, water circulation is less restricted, and there is a slow but steady exchange of water between the estuary and the ocean. Fjord-type estuaries can be found along the coasts of Alaska, the Puget Sound region of western Washington state, British Columbia, eastern Canada, Greenland, Iceland, New Zealand, and Norway.

Tectonically produced
These estuaries are formed by subsidence or land cut off from the ocean by land movement associated with faulting, volcanoes, and landslides.  Inundation from eustatic sea-level rise during the Holocene Epoch has also contributed to the formation of these estuaries. There are only a small number of tectonically produced estuaries; one example is the San Francisco Bay, which was formed by the crustal movements of the San Andreas fault system causing the inundation of the lower reaches of the Sacramento and San Joaquin rivers.

Classification based on water circulation

Salt wedge

In this type of estuary, river output greatly exceeds marine input and tidal effects have minor importance. Freshwater floats on top of the seawater in a layer that gradually thins as it moves seaward.  The denser seawater moves landward along the bottom of the estuary, forming a wedge-shaped layer that is thinner as it approaches land.  As a velocity difference develops between the two layers, shear forces generate internal waves at the interface, mixing the seawater upward with the freshwater.  An examples of a salt wedge estuary is  Mississippi River and Mandovi estuary in Goa during monsoon period.

Partially mixed
As tidal forcing increases, river output becomes less than the marine input.  Here, current induced turbulence causes mixing of the whole water column such that salinity varies more longitudinally rather than vertically, leading to a moderately stratified condition.  Examples include the Chesapeake Bay and Narragansett Bay.

Well-mixed
Tidal mixing forces exceed river output, resulting in a well-mixed water column and the disappearance of the vertical salinity gradient.  The freshwater-seawater boundary is eliminated due to the intense turbulent mixing and eddy effects. The lower reaches of Delaware Bay and the Raritan River in New Jersey are examples of vertically homogeneous estuaries.

Inverse
Inverse estuaries occur in dry climates where evaporation greatly exceeds the inflow of freshwater.  A salinity maximum zone is formed, and both riverine and oceanic water flow close to the surface towards this zone.  This water is pushed downward and spreads along the bottom in both the seaward and landward direction. An example of an inverse estuary is Spencer Gulf, South Australia.

Intermittent
Estuary type varies dramatically depending on freshwater input, and is capable of changing from a wholly marine embayment to any of the other estuary types.

Physiochemical variation
The most important variable characteristics of estuary water are the concentration of dissolved oxygen, salinity and sediment load. There is extreme spatial variability in salinity, with a range of near-zero at the tidal limit of tributary rivers to 3.4% at the estuary mouth. At any one point, the salinity will vary considerably over time and seasons, making it a harsh environment for organisms. Sediment often settles in intertidal mudflats which are extremely difficult to colonize. No points of attachment exist for algae, so vegetation based habitat is not established. Sediment can also clog feeding and respiratory structures of species, and special adaptations exist within mudflat species to cope with this problem. Lastly, dissolved oxygen variation can cause problems for life forms. Nutrient-rich sediment from man-made sources can promote primary production life cycles, perhaps leading to eventual decay removing the dissolved oxygen from the water; thus hypoxic or anoxic zones can develop.

Implications of eutrophication on estuaries

Effects of eutrophication on biogeochemical cycles 

Nitrogen is often the lead cause of eutrophication in estuaries in temperate zones. During a eutrophication event, biogeochemical feedback decreases the amount of available silica. These feedbacks also increase the supply of nitrogen and phosphorus, creating conditions where harmful algal blooms can persist. Given the now off-balance nitrogen cycle, estuaries can be driven to phosphorus limitation instead of nitrogen limitation. Estuaries can be severely impacted by an unbalanced phosphorus cycle, as phosphorus interacts with nitrogen and silica availability.

With an abundance of nutrients in the ecosystem, plants and algae overgrow and eventually decompose, which produce a significant amount of carbon dioxide. While releasing  into the water and atmosphere, these organisms are also intaking all or nearly all of the available oxygen creating a hypoxic environment and unbalanced oxygen cycle. The excess carbon in the form of  can lead to low pH levels and ocean acidification, which is more harmful for vulnerable coastal regions like estuaries.

Effects of eutrophication on estuarine plants 

Eutrophication has been seen to negatively impact many plant communities in estuarine ecosystems. Salt marshes are a type of ecosystem in some estuaries that have been negatively impacted by eutrophication. Cordgrass vegetation dominates the salt marsh landscape. Excess nutrients allow the plants to grow at greater rates in above ground biomass, however less energy is allocated to the roots since nutrients is abundant. This leads to a lower biomass in the vegetation below ground which destabilizes the banks of the marsh causing increased rates of erosion. A similar phenomenon occurs in mangrove swamps, which are another potential ecosystem in estuaries. An increase in nitrogen causes an increase in shoot growth and a decrease in root growth. Weaker root systems cause a mangrove tree to be less resilient in seasons of drought, which can lead to the death of the mangrove. This shift in above ground and below ground biomass caused by eutrophication could hindered plant success in these ecosystems.

Effects of eutrophication on estuarine animals 

Across all biomes, eutrophication often results in plant death but the impacts do not end there. Plant death alters the entire food web structure which can result in the death of animals within the afflicted biome. Estuaries are hotspots for biodiversity, containing a majority of commercial fish catch, making the impacts of eutrophication that much greater within estuaries. Some specific estuarine animals feel the effects of eutrophication more strongly than others. One example is the whitefish species from the European Alps. Eutrophication reduced the oxygen levels in their habitats so greatly that whitefish eggs could not survive, causing local extinctions. However, some animals, such as carnivorous fish, tend to do well in nutrient poor environments and can benefit from eutrophication. This can be seen in populations of bass or pikes.

Effects of eutrophication on human activities 

Eutrophication can affect many marine habitats which can lead to economic consequences. The commercial fishing industry relies upon estuaries for approximately 68 percent of their catch by value because of the great biodiversity of this ecosystem. During an algal bloom, fishermen have noticed a significant increase in the quantity of fish. A sudden increase in primary productivity causes spikes in fish populations which leads to more oxygen being utilized. It is the continued deoxygenation of the water that then causes a decline in fish populations. These effects can begin in estuaries and have a wide effect on the surrounding water bodies.  In turn, this can decrease fishing industry sales in one area and across the country. Production in 2016 from recreational and commercial fishing contributes billions of dollars to the United States’ gross domestic product (GDP). A decrease in production within this industry can affect any of the 1.7 million people the fishing industry employs yearly across the United States.

Implications for marine life
Estuaries are incredibly dynamic systems, where temperature, salinity, turbidity, depth and flow all change daily in response to the tides. This dynamism makes estuaries highly productive habitats, but also make it difficult for many species to survive year-round. As a result, estuaries large and small experience strong seasonal variation in their fish communities. In winter, the fish community is dominated by hardy marine residents, and in summer a variety of marine and anadromous fishes move into and out of estuaries, capitalizing on their high productivity. Estuaries provide a critical habitat to a variety of species that rely on estuaries for life-cycle completion. Pacific Herring (Clupea pallasii) are known to lay their eggs in estuaries and bays, surfperch give birth in estuaries, juvenile flatfish and rockfish migrate to estuaries to rear, and anadromous salmonids and lampreys use estuaries as migration corridors. Also, migratory bird populations, such as the black-tailed godwit, rely on estuaries.

Two of the main challenges of estuarine life are the variability in salinity and sedimentation. Many species of fish and invertebrates have various methods to control or conform to the shifts in salt concentrations and are termed osmoconformers and osmoregulators. Many animals also burrow to avoid predation and to live in a more stable sedimental environment. However, large numbers of bacteria are found within the sediment which has a very high oxygen demand. This reduces the levels of oxygen within the sediment often resulting in partially anoxic conditions, which can be further exacerbated by limited water flow.

Phytoplankton are key primary producers in estuaries. They move with the water bodies and can be flushed in and out with the tides. Their productivity is largely dependent upon the turbidity of the water. The main phytoplankton present are diatoms and dinoflagellates which are abundant in the sediment.

It is important to remember that a primary source of food for many organisms on estuaries, including bacteria, is detritus from the settlement of the sedimentation.

Human impact

Of the thirty-two largest cities in the world in the early 1990s, twenty-two were located on estuaries.

As ecosystems, estuaries are under threat from human activities such as pollution and overfishing. They are also threatened by sewage, coastal settlement, land clearance and much more. Estuaries are affected by events far upstream, and concentrate materials such as pollutants and sediments. Land run-off and industrial, agricultural, and domestic waste enter rivers and are discharged into estuaries. Contaminants can be introduced which do not disintegrate rapidly in the marine environment, such as plastics, pesticides, furans, dioxins, phenols and heavy metals.

Such toxins can accumulate in the tissues of many species of aquatic life in a process called bioaccumulation. They also accumulate in benthic environments, such as estuaries and bay muds: a geological record of human activities of the last century. The elemental composition of biofilm reflect areas of the estuary impacted by human activities, and over time may shift the basic composition of the ecosystem, and the reversible or irreversible changes in the abiotic and biotic parts of the systems from the bottom up.

For example, Chinese and Russian industrial pollution, such as phenols and heavy metals, has devastated fish stocks in the Amur River and damaged its estuary soil.

Estuaries tend to be naturally eutrophic because land runoff discharges nutrients into estuaries. With human activities, land run-off also now includes the many chemicals used as fertilizers in agriculture as well as waste from livestock and humans. Excess oxygen-depleting chemicals in the water can lead to hypoxia and the creation of dead zones. This can result in reductions in water quality, fish, and other animal populations.
Overfishing also occurs. Chesapeake Bay once had a flourishing oyster population that has been almost wiped out by overfishing. Oysters filter these pollutants, and either eat them or shape them into small packets that are deposited on the bottom where they are harmless. Historically the oysters filtered the estuary's entire water volume of excess nutrients every three or four days. Today that process takes almost a year, and sediment, nutrients, and algae can cause problems in local waters.

Examples

Africa
 Orange River Estuary
 Lake St Lucia Estuary

Asia
 Gulf of Ob Estuary
 Yenisei Gulf Estuary
 Puerto Princesa Underground River
 Hàn River Estuary
 Kraburi River Estuary
 Waeru River Estuary of Chanthaburi Province
 Dawei River Estuary
 Naf River Estuary
 Meghna River Estuary

Europe
 The Gironde
 Golden Horn
 The Humber
 Severn Estuary
 Shannon Estuary
 Thames Estuary
 The Wash
 Unterelbe
 Western Scheldt
 Tagus Estuary

North America
 Albemarle Sound including Outer Banks of North Carolina
 Chesapeake Bay including Hampton Roads
 Columbia River Estuary
 Delaware Bay
 Drake's Estero
 East River
 Estuary of Saint Lawrence
 Fraser River
 Galveston Bay
 Great Bay
 Indian River Lagoon
 Laguna Madre
 Lake Borgne
 Lake Merritt
 Long Island Sound
 Mississippi River Delta
 Lake Pontchartrain
 Mobile Bay
 Narragansett Bay
 Newport Back Bay
 New York-New Jersey Harbor
 Coos Bay
 Puget Sound
 Pamlico Sound including the Outer Banks of North Carolina
 San Francisco Bay
 Tampa Bay

Oceania
 Avon Heathcote Estuary (Christchurch, New Zealand)
 Gippsland Lakes
 Port Jackson (Sydney Harbour)
 Spencer Gulf

South America
 Amazon River
 Iguape-Cananéia-Paranaguá estuary lagoon complex
 Lagoa dos Patos and Lagoon Mirim
 Rio de la Plata

See also

References

External links

 Animated documentary on Chesapeake Bay NOAA.
 
 The Estuary Guide (Based on experience and R&D within the UK)

 
Geodesy
Coastal geography
Environmental impact of fishing
Coastal and oceanic landforms
Bodies of water
Aquatic ecology